Eastmoor Academy is a public high school located on the east side of Columbus, Ohio.  It is part of Columbus City Schools.

Eastmoor Academy was formerly known as Eastmoor High School. The school's colors are red, white and blue, and its mascot is a warrior.

Eastmoor is the high school alma mater of two-time Heisman Trophy winner Archie Griffin, after whom their football stadium is now named; it is also the alma mater of former Lynyrd Skynyrd drummer Artimus Pyle (class of 1966), and jazz musician Michael Feinstein. Gary Ballen aka today as the Human Jukebox" was a 1970 graduate of EHS. Gary has lived an exceptional life in the music entertainment industry including touring with many well-known performers, including Straight Outta Compton Gansta Rap group, "NWA".  Robert "Tico Bob" Street (Class of 1969), became a Columbus radio personality in the 1970s  now residing in Arizona, Robert is a successful transportation business executive and founder of the Robert Street Band, performing throughout the Southwestern United States. Internationally published and cited author David M Baker, GG was a 1971 graduate of Eastmoor High School. Another Eastmoor High School alumni was birding artist Charles "Buddy" Gambill (1968). Detroit Lyons Linebacker, Paul Naumoff is a graduate (1964), as was Doug Van Horn, Offensive Lineman for the Detroit Lyons and later the New York Giants. Ronald G. Shafer, a member of the first graduating class in 1957, was a reporter and Washington political features editor at the Wall Street Journal over a 38-year-career. Shafer still writes for the Washington Post.

In the 1960s, frequent performers at Eastmoor included Mexican virtuoso solo trumpeter, Rafael Méndez, and the incomparable American Jazz trumpeter, Doc Severinsen.  During the eighties, the school was a frequent stop for high-profile speakers in the civil rights movement such as Coretta Scott King.

The movie Speak starring Kristen Stewart was filmed at Eastmoor in 2003.

In 2008, the Eastmoor football team went 13–2, eventually losing in the Division 3 State Championship Game to the Aurora Greenmen, 21–10.

Ohio High School Athletic Association State Championships

 Girls Track and Field - 2004, 2005 
Girls Track Team - State Champions - 2013

External links
 School website

References

High schools in Columbus, Ohio
Public high schools in Ohio